Ilitha is a township southwest of Berlin, falling under the Buffalo City Metropolitan Municipality in the Eastern Cape province of South Africa.

References

Populated places in Buffalo City Metropolitan Municipality
Townships in the Eastern Cape